Cumaná is the capital city of Venezuela's Sucre State. Cumaná was one of the first cities founded by Spain in the mainland Americas and is the oldest continuously-inhabited Hispanic-established city in South America. Its early history includes several successful counters by the indigenous people of the area who were attempting to prevent Spanish incursion into their land, resulting in the city being refounded several times. The municipality of Sucre, which includes the capital city, Cumaná, had a population of 358,919 at the 2011 Census; the latest estimate (as at mid 2016) is 423,546.

The city is located at the mouth of the Manzanares River on the Caribbean coast, in the northeast of Venezuela. It is home to first and most important of the five campuses of the Universidad de Oriente, and is a busy maritime port, home of one of the largest tuna fleets in Venezuela. The city is close to Mochima National Park, whose beaches are a popular tourist destination among Venezuelans.

Key heroes of and contributors to the Venezuelan independence movement were born in Cumaná, including Antonio José de Sucre, the ‘Gran Mariscal de Ayacucho,’ a leading general who also served as President of Bolivia and President of Peru. Cumaná is also the birthplace to eminent poets, writers and politicians like Andrés Eloy Blanco, an important figure in Latin American literature and who later rose to the national political scene; as well as José Antonio Ramos Sucre, another distinguished poet and diplomat. Several important scientists including Pehr Löfling from Sweden, Alexander von Humboldt from Germany, and Aimé Bonpland from France accomplished experimental works and discoveries while visiting or living in Cumaná in the 18th century. The city is also home to a Toyota plant, which manufactures the Hilux and Toyota Fortuner.

History
Cumaná was the first settlement founded by Spain in Venezuela, established in 1515 by Franciscan friars, under the name Nueva Toledo, but due to successful attacks by the indigenous people (such as the Cumanagoto people), it had to be refounded several times until Diego Hernández de Serpa's refoundation in 1569 with the name of Cumaná. Bartolomé de las Casas, attempting a peaceful colonization scheme, was pre-empted by Gonzalo de Ocampo's 1521 punitive raids against the local indigenous people, in retaliation for the destruction of the Dominican convent at Chiribichi. In 1537 New Andalusia Province was established, with Cumaná as capital (for which the Province was also known as the Province of Cumaná).

After Amerindian attacks became less of a threat, the city was on several occasions destroyed by earthquakes. Thus, the oldest part of the city is late 17th and 18th century; almost none of the 16th century architecture survived. Gained independence on 7/5/1811.

Attractions 
The city features a wide variety of colonial style architecture still in excellent condition. The San Antonio de la Eminencia Castle, a large Spanish fort, is open to the public and can be seen from the beach. Also surviving is the Santa Maria de la Cabeza castle, which was built in 1669. The Museo del Mar (Museum of the Sea) displays marine and maritime artifacts.

Indigenous species 
The Cumana region is home to the Endler's livebearer, a vibrantly coloured aquarium fish named after John Endler who discovered it in nearby Laguna de Los Patos. This fish is now extinct within the lake but survives in home aquaria across the world.

Notable people

Antonio José de Sucre (1795–1830), independence leader

José Antonio Ramos Sucre (1890–1930), poet and diplomat
Andrés Eloy Blanco (1897–1955), poet, humorist and politician
Luis Peñalver (b. 1941), baseball player
Iñaki Anasagasti (b. 1947), Spanish politician
Rafael Betancourt (b. 1975), baseball player
Francisco Sánchez (b. 1976), swimmer, world champion
Luis Maza (b. 1980), baseball player
Armando Galarraga (b. 1982), baseball player
César Jiménez (b. 1984), baseball player
Vanessa Peretti (b. 1986), first deaf entrant in the Miss Venezuela pageant
Jesús Sucre (b. 1988), baseball player
Gelmin Rivas (b. 1989), footballer

Transportation
The city is served by Antonio José de Sucre Airport, with commercial passenger airline flights to Caracas.

Gallery

References 

 Krzysztof Dydniski & Charlotte Beech, Lonely Planet Venezuela, (2004)

External links 
 

 
Cities in Sucre (state)
Populated places established in 1515
Port cities and towns in Venezuela
1515 establishments in the Spanish Empire